The men's 10 metre air rifle shooting event at the 2011 Pan American Games was held on October 17 at the Pan American Shooting Polygon in Guadalajara. The defending Pan American Games champion is Jason Parker of the United States.

The event consisted of two rounds: a qualifier and a final. In the qualifier, each shooter fired 60 shots with an air rifle at 10 metres distance from the standing position. Scores for each shot were in increments of 1, with a maximum score of 10.

The top 8 shooters in the qualifying round moved on to the final round. There, they fired an additional 10 shots. These shots scored in increments of .1, with a maximum score of 10.9. The total score from all 70 shots was used to determine final ranking.

With the second-place finish (first-place finisher had already qualified a quota spot) Jonathan Hall of the United States qualifies his country a quota spot for the men's 10 metre air rifle event at the 2012 Summer Olympics in London, Great Britain.

Schedule
All times are Central Standard Time (UTC-6).

Records
The existing world and Pan American Games records were as follows.

Results

Qualification round
26 athletes from 16 countries competed.

Final

References

Shooting at the 2011 Pan American Games